(William) Frederick Kitchen (28 December 1890 – 16 September 1969) was an English farm labourer and writer. His best known work is Brother to the Ox (1939), which has been adapted for radio and television.

Life and work
Kitchen was born in Edwinstowe in Sherwood Forest in 1890 to a Methodist family. His father was a cowman on the Sandbeck Estate, held by the Earl of Scarbrough, and Fred grew up on the estate, living in a tied cottage. He started work in 1904 as a farmer's boy just after his 13th birthday, in the West Riding of Yorkshire, following the death of his father from diabetes. As the cottage was tied to his father's job, Kitchen and the family were forced to leave. His mother became a needlewoman after her husband's death, taking on work from local manor houses. Kitchen started out as a horseman but went on to work around collieries, and on railways. In 1925, after 13 years working in industrial settings, he became a farm labourer again, in Hooton Levitt, and at Maltby Main.

As a farm labourer with little formal education, Kitchen borrowed extensively from public libraries and became inspired by the works of writers such as Dickens and George Eliot. In 1933, he studied with the local branch of Workers Educational Association (WEA) in Worksop, where he was encouraged to write his own works. He wrote a personal diary for fifty years, which forms a near complete, extant account of his working life.  Kitchen became a journalist and radio broadcaster and in later life worked as a school caretaker. 

Brother to the Ox is an autobiographical account of a countryman's life during the first half of the twentieth century in Northern England. Unromantic and unconcerned with presenting country living as idyllic as more middle class writers of the time had generally presented it, it may be considered an 'anti-pastoral work'. Unusual for its time, it is a first-hand account of Kitchen's life in coking factories, on the railways, working as a cowman and in mining villages, moving from town to town in search of work. Critic H E Bates wrote of the book: "Mr. Kitchen writes as the grass grows and Brother to the Ox will take its place, for exact and simple beauty, with the best interpretations of the countryside."

The book's title comes from the long poem "The Man With the Hoe" by Edwin Markham

    Bowed by the weight of centuries he leans
    Upon his hoe and gazes on the ground,
    The emptiness of ages in his face,
    And on his back the burden of the world.
    Who made him dead to rapture and despair,
    A thing that grieves not and that never hopes.
    Stolid and stunned, a brother to the ox?

The book was adapted by ITV (Brother to the Ox, 1981).

His life story was dramatized from his journals for BBC radio by Stephen Wakelam, broadcast in two week long serials as Journal of a Joskin (2013 and 2015).

Books
Brother to the Ox (1939) London: J. M. Dent 
Life on the Land  
Nettleworth Parva
What the Countryman Wants to Know 
Songs of Sherwood
Foxendale Farm  
Winter at Foxendale 
More Adventures at Foxendale Farm
The Farming Front  
Jesse and his Friends 
Goslington, portrait of a village  
The Ploughman Homeward Plods (novel, 1960) London: J. M. Dent  
The Ploughman
The Commoners 
Settlers in England
Indian Scenes

References

External links
Pages from Kitchen's diary (photographs), BBC, 2013
Writing The Century: BBC Radio 4, 15 Minute Drama 'The Diary of a Joskin'

1890 births
1969 deaths
People from Newark and Sherwood (district)
19th-century English novelists
English broadcasters
English miners
English farmers
British male poets
English male novelists
20th-century English poets
20th-century English novelists
19th-century English male writers
20th-century English male writers